Good and evil is a common dichotomy in religion, philosophy, ethics, and psychology.

Good and Evil may also refer to:

Good and Evil (film), a 1921 film directed by Michael Curtiz
Good and Evil (Chinese TV series), a 2021 drama series
Good & Evil (TV series), a 1991 American sitcom
Good and Evil, a 2004 skateboarding video produced by Toy Machine
Good & Evil (album), a 2011 album by Tally Hall
Good and Evil (painting), a 19th-century painting by Victor Orsel

See also
Beyond Good and Evil (disambiguation)
Good vs. Evil (disambiguation)
Good (disambiguation)
Evil (disambiguation)